The arrondissement of Lons-le-Saunier is an arrondissement of France in the Jura department in the Bourgogne-Franche-Comté region. It has 249 communes.

Composition

The communes of the arrondissement of Lons-le-Saunier are:

Alièze
Andelot-en-Montagne
Andelot-Morval
Ardon
Arinthod
Arlay
Aromas
Arsure-Arsurette
Augea
Augisey
Balanod
Barésia-sur-l'Ain
Baume-les-Messieurs
Beaufort-Orbagna
Beffia
Bief-des-Maisons
Bief-du-Fourg
Billecul
Bletterans
Blois-sur-Seille
Blye
Bois-de-Gand
Boissia
La Boissière
Bonlieu
Bonnefontaine
Bornay
Bourg-de-Sirod
Briod
Broissia
Censeau
Cerniébaud
Cernon
Cesancey
La Chailleuse
Les Chalesmes
Chambéria
Champagnole
Champrougier
Chapelle-Voland
Chapois
Charcier
Charency
Charézier
La Charme
Charnod
La Chassagne
Château-Chalon
Châtelneuf
Châtillon
Chaumergy
Chaux-des-Crotenay
La Chaux-en-Bresse
Chavéria
Chemenot
Chêne-Sec
Chevreaux
Chevrotaine
Chille
Chilly-le-Vignoble
Cize
Clairvaux-les-Lacs
Cogna
Commenailles
Condamine
Condes
Conliège
Conte
Cornod
Cosges
Courbette
Courbouzon
Courlans
Courlaoux
Cousance
Crans
Cressia
Crotenay
Cuisia
Cuvier
Denezières
Desnes
Les Deux-Fays
Digna
Domblans
Dompierre-sur-Mont
Doucier
Doye
Dramelay
Écrille
Entre-deux-Monts
Équevillon
Esserval-Tartre
L'Étoile
La Favière
Foncine-le-Bas
Foncine-le-Haut
Fontainebrux
Fontenu
Foulenay
Francheville
Fraroz
La Frasnée
Le Frasnois
Frébuans
Frontenay
Genod
Geruge
Gevingey
Gigny
Gillois
Gizia
Graye-et-Charnay
Hautecour
Hauteroche, Jura
Ladoye-sur-Seille
Le Larderet
Largillay-Marsonnay
Larnaud
Le Latet
La Latette
Lavigny
Lent
Loisia
Lombard
Longcochon
Lons-le-Saunier
Loulle
Le Louverot
Macornay
Mantry
Marigna-sur-Valouse
Marigny
Marnézia
La Marre
Maynal
Menétru-le-Vignoble
Menétrux-en-Joux
Mérona
Mesnois
Messia-sur-Sorne
Mièges
Mignovillard
Moiron
Monnetay
Monnet-la-Ville
Montagna-le-Reconduit
Montaigu
Montain
Montfleur
Montigny-sur-l'Ain
Montlainsia
Montmorot
Montrevel
Montrond
Mont-sur-Monnet
Mournans-Charbonny
Moutonne
Moutoux
Nance
Nancuise
Les Nans
Nevy-sur-Seille
Ney
Nogna
Nozeroy
Onglières
Onoz
Orgelet
Pannessières
Le Pasquier
Passenans
Patornay
Perrigny
Pillemoine
Pimorin
Le Pin
Plainoiseau
Plaisia
Les Planches-en-Montagne
Plénise
Plénisette
Poids-de-Fiole
Pont-de-Poitte
Pont-du-Navoy
Présilly
Publy
Quintigny
Recanoz
Reithouse
Relans
Les Repôts
Revigny
Rix
Rosay
Rotalier
Rothonay
Ruffey-sur-Seille
Rye
Saffloz
Saint-Amour
Saint-Didier
Sainte-Agnès
Saint-Germain-en-Montagne
Saint-Hymetière-sur-Valouse
Saint-Lamain
Saint-Maur
Saint-Maurice-Crillat
Sapois
Sarrogna
Saugeot
Sellières
Sergenaux
Sergenon
Sirod
Songeson
Soucia
Supt
Syam
Thoirette-Coisia
Thoiria
Thoissia
Toulouse-le-Château
La Tour-du-Meix
Trenal
Les Trois-Châteaux
Uxelles
Val-d'Épy
Valempoulières
Val-Sonnette
Val Suran
Valzin en Petite Montagne
Vannoz
Le Vaudioux
Verges
Véria
Vernantois
Le Vernois
Vers-en-Montagne
Vers-sous-Sellières
Vertamboz
Vescles
Vevy
Villeneuve-sous-Pymont
Villevieux
Le Villey
Vincent-Froideville
Voiteur
Vosbles-Valfin

History

The arrondissement of Lons-le-Saunier was created in 1800. In May 2006 it gained the canton of Chaumergy from the arrondissement of Dole, and it lost the canton of Villers-Farlay to the arrondissement of Dole. At the January 2017 reorganisation of the arrondissements of Jura, it gained four communes from the arrondissement of Saint-Claude, and it lost 67 communes to the arrondissement of Dole.

As a result of the reorganisation of the cantons of France which came into effect in 2015, the borders of the cantons are no longer related to the borders of the arrondissements. The cantons of the arrondissement of Lons-le-Saunier were, as of January 2015:

 Arbois
 Arinthod
 Beaufort
 Bletterans
 Champagnole
 Chaumergy
 Clairvaux-les-Lacs
 Conliège
 Lons-le-Saunier-Nord
 Lons-le-Saunier-Sud
 Nozeroy
 Orgelet
 Les Planches-en-Montagne
 Poligny
 Saint-Amour
 Saint-Julien
 Salins-les-Bains
 Sellières
 Voiteur

References

Lons-le-Saunier